Scariates basipennis is a species of beetle in the family Cerambycidae, and the only species in the genus Scariates. It was described by Fairmaire in 1894.

References

Dorcasominae
Beetles described in 1894
Monotypic beetle genera